The Gigolo is a 1960 French romantic drama film written and directed by Jacques Deray. It is loosely based on the novel Le Gigolo written by Jacques Robert.

Plot 
Agatha, a wealthy widow in her 40s, falls in love with the handsome doctor Damper. She then wants to end her former relationship with her young lover Jacky, who is not ready to let go.

Cast 

 Alida Valli : Agathe
 Jean-Claude Brialy : Jacky
 Jean Chevrier : Dr. Dampier
 Valérie Lagrange : Gillou
 Philippe Nicaud : Édouard
 Julien Bertheau : Commissioner
 Jean Degrave : Bligny 
 Rosy Varte : Marilyn
 Jeanne Pérez : Marthe 
 Sacha Briquet : Man at bar

References

External links

1960 films
1960 romantic drama films
French romantic drama films
Films directed by Jacques Deray
Films based on French novels
1960s French films